Leonardo Alfredo Ramos Girón (born 11 September 1969) is a Uruguayan football manager and former player who played as a midfielder.

Club career
Ramos played for Vélez Sársfield, Banfield, Estudiantes de La Plata, River Plate and Chacarita Juniors in the Primera División de Argentina. He had two spells with Salamanca in the Spanish Segunda División. He also had a brief spell in Chile for Colo-Colo.

International career
Ramos made eight appearances for the senior Uruguay national football team from 1991 to 2000, including five FIFA World Cup qualifying matches.

Coaching career
In May 2018, it was announced that Ramos would leave Peñarol and join Al-Ettifaq.

References

External links
 

1969 births
Living people
Footballers from Montevideo
Uruguayan footballers
Uruguayan expatriate footballers
Uruguayan football managers
Uruguay international footballers
1997 Copa América players
Club Atlético Vélez Sarsfield footballers
Club Atlético Banfield footballers
Estudiantes de La Plata footballers
Club Atlético River Plate footballers
Chacarita Juniors footballers
Nueva Chicago footballers
Aldosivi footballers
Defensa y Justicia footballers
UD Salamanca players
Colo-Colo footballers
C.A. Progreso players
Peñarol players
Independiente Rivadavia footballers
Danubio F.C. players
Expatriate footballers in Argentina
Expatriate footballers in Chile
Expatriate footballers in Spain
Uruguayan Primera División players
Chilean Primera División players
Argentine Primera División players
La Liga players
Segunda División players
Association football midfielders
Nueva Chicago managers
Estudiantes de Buenos Aires managers
Peñarol managers
Danubio F.C. managers
Unión La Calera managers
Ettifaq FC managers
Barcelona S.C. managers
Campeonato Nacional (Chile) managers
Uruguayan Primera División managers
Argentine Primera División managers
Saudi Professional League managers
Expatriate football managers in Chile
Expatriate football managers in Argentina
Expatriate football managers in Paraguay
Expatriate football managers in Saudi Arabia
Expatriate football managers in Ecuador
C.A. Progreso managers